Hypericum walteri, the greater marsh St. Johnswort or Walter's marsh St. John's Wort, is a flowering plant endemic to the eastern United States, from Texas to Delaware north to Illinois. It grows along waterbodies such as lakes and streams, in marshes, and in swamp forests.

References

walteri
Endemic flora of the United States
Flora without expected TNC conservation status